Vance v. Ball State University, 570 U.S. 421 (2013), is a U.S. Supreme Court case regarding who is a "supervisor" for the purposes of harassment lawsuits. The Supreme Court upheld the Seventh Circuit's decision in a 5–4 opinion written by Samuel Alito, rejecting the Equal Employment Opportunity Commission's interpretation of who counts as a supervisor. The case was important because it resolved a dispute between several different circuits.

The issue presented before the Court was:

Background 

While working at Ball State University, Maetta Vance contended that Saundra Davis, a catering specialist, had made Vance’s life at work unpleasant through physical acts and racial harassment. Vance sued her employer, the university, for workplace harassment by a supervisor.

To win a lawsuit for harassment under Title VII of the Civil Rights Act of 1964, it is necessary to show that the employer is negligent in responding to complaints about harassment. However, to win a lawsuit for harassment by a supervisor, the employer does not have to be negligent because Title VII imputes the supervisor’s acts to the employer. Vance asserted that Davis was a supervisor; Ball State claimed the opposite.

The District Court and the Seventh Circuit Court of Appeals had determined that Davis was not Vance’s supervisor, because Davis did not have the power to direct the terms and conditions of her employment.

Supreme Court decision

The Court upheld the Seventh Circuit's interpretation in its decision issued on June 24, 2013. It used a narrow interpretation of the term "supervisor", so that a person may only be considered a supervisor if he or she can take tangible action against the employee.

See also 
List of United States Supreme Court cases, volume 570
Negligence in employment

References

External links
 

United States Supreme Court cases
United States tort case law
2013 in United States case law
Ball State University
Catering
United States employment discrimination case law
United States Supreme Court cases of the Roberts Court
United States racial discrimination case law